Damber Dhoj Tumbahamphe is a Nepalese politician, belonging to the Communist Party of Nepal (UML). In the 2008 Constituent Assembly election he was elected from the Taplejung-2 constituency, winning 8628 votes.

References

Living people
Communist Party of Nepal (Unified Marxist–Leninist) politicians
Year of birth missing (living people)

Members of the 1st Nepalese Constituent Assembly
Members of the 2nd Nepalese Constituent Assembly